Yarborough or Yarbrough are related English toponymic surnames. Variants include Yerberg, Yarburgh, Yarboro and other forms.

Notable people with the surname include:

Barton Yarborough, American radio actor
Cale Yarborough, American race car driver
Camille Yarbrough American musician
Caterina Jarboro (born Katie Yarborough), American opera singer
Cavin Yarbrough, American musician, member of musical group Yarbrough and Peoples
Cedric Yarbrough, American comedic actor, best known for his role on Reno 911!
Chelsea Quinn Yarbro, American fantasy author
Destanie Yarbrough, American professional martial artist
Don Yarborough, American politician
Eddie Yarbrough, American professional football player
Emmanuel Yarborough (Manny Yarborough), American amateur sumo wrestler, world's heaviest athlete 
Frances Yarborough, American actress and former wife of Don Knotts
James C. Yarbrough (born 1957), American army general
Jean Yarbrough, American film director
 Jim Yarbrough (offensive lineman), American football player
 Jim Yarbrough (defensive back), American football player
 Jim Yarbrough (basketball), American college basketball coach
Jon Yarbrough, American billionaire, founder of Video Gaming Technologies
Kim Yarbrough, American singer and actress
LeeRoy Yarbrough, (1938–1984) American race car driver
Steve Yarbrough (politician), American politician
Steve Yarbrough (writer), American novelist
Glenn Yarbrough (1930–2016), American singer, lead of The Limeliters
Ralph Yarborough (1903–96), American politician
Ryan Yarborough, former professional American football player
Ryan Yarbrough, American Major League Baseball player 
Thomas R. Yarborough, American politician in Lake Elsinore, California 
Vincent Yarbrough, American professional basketball player
William Yarbrough, professional soccer player in Mexico and America
William P. Yarborough, American general
Charles Anderson-Pelham, 2nd Earl of Yarborough, British nobleman and namesake of Yarborough bridge hand

See also
Earl of Yarborough, hereditary title in the Peerage of the United Kingdom
, American warship
Yarborough (bridge), an especially weak hand in contract bridge
Yarborough (novel), a 1964 novel by B. H. Friedman

English-language surnames
English toponymic surnames